"Slumming on Park Avenue" is a popular song written by Irving Berlin for the 1937 film On the Avenue, where it was introduced by Alice Faye. Popular recordings in 1937 were by Red Norvo and his Orchestra (vocal by Mildred Bailey), Fletcher Henderson (vocal: Jerry Blake) and by Jimmie Lunceford.

Other notable recordings
Petula Clark - You Are My Lucky Star (1957). 
Ella Fitzgerald - Ella Fitzgerald Sings the Irving Berlin Songbook (1958)

References

Songs written by Irving Berlin
Songs about New York City
Songs about streets
1937 songs
Ella Fitzgerald songs
Mildred Bailey songs